The U.S. Department of State's Bureau of International Information Programs (IIP) supports the department's public diplomacy efforts by providing and supporting the places, content, and infrastructure needed for sustained conversations with foreign audiences. It was headed by the Coordinator for International Information Programs. IIP was one of three bureaus that report to the Undersecretary for Public Diplomacy and Public Affairs.  The Bureau of Educational and Cultural Affairs and the Bureau of Public Affairs were the sister bureaus. On May 28, 2019, the bureau merged with the Bureau of Public Affairs into the Bureau of Global Public Affairs, and the duties of the Coordinator merged into the duties of the Assistant Secretary of State for Global Public Affairs.

History 

When the Foreign Affairs and Restructuring Act abolished the [United States Information Agency] (USIA) on October 1, 1999, USIA's broadcasting functions were moved to the newly created [Broadcasting Board of Governors] (BBG), and its non-broadcasting information functions were given to the newly created Under Secretary of State for Public Diplomacy and Public Affairs.  The Bureau of International Information Programs was created out of this restructuring.

Mission and purpose 

According to the bureau's page on the Department of State website, IIP "provides and supports the places, content, and infrastructure needed for sustained conversations with foreign audiences to build America's reputation abroad".

Physical and virtual places include over 700 American Spaces around the world, as well as a large social media community that numbers over 12 million followers.  Content includes publications, video, and U.S. expert speakers, who engage foreign audiences both in person and through virtual programs.  An example of this is the Arabic-language Twitter channel @USAbilAraby.  IIP manages the infrastructure for all embassy and consulate websites, translations of public remarks by the President and Secretary, and maintains internal websites with resources for use by public diplomacy officers for overseas programs.

Role and responsibility

The Bureau of International Information Programs provides public diplomacy materials and support in three primary areas:

 Digital
IIP operates the department's embassy and consulate websites (http://usembassy.gov) in over 60 languages.  IIP also supports embassy social media efforts with Facebook pages and Twitter sites in six languages.

IIP also operates an interactive web-chat platform that links foreign audiences to U.S. subject matter experts, opinion-makers, community leaders, and government officials in more than 800 programs each year. In September 2014, the bureau launched a new social sharing platform ShareAmerica to distribute public diplomacy content.

 American Spaces

American Spaces exemplify the United States commitment to a core tenet of democracy: the citizen's right to free access to information.  Hosting more than 16 million visits each year, American Spaces supports public diplomacy by creating a place for in-person engagement with foreign audiences.  Over 700 Spaces are hosted in embassies, schools, libraries, and other partner institutions in 169 countries.  They provide information about United States' policy, culture, and values as well as study in the United States.  They also support English language learning and activities for alumni of international visitor programs.

 Public Diplomacy (PD) Content
IIP creates and curates content that provides context and information on U.S. foreign policy topics in a variety of formats ranging from video to print publications to audiobooks, reaching more than one billion people a year.  Much of this content, along with transcripts of the Secretary's and President's speeches, is available to embassies in multiple languages.  IIP also produces more than 125 video products each year and recruits more than 650 speakers annually, including Supreme Court justices, renowned authors, innovators, scholars, entrepreneurs, journalists, and sports figures who connect directly with more than 160,000 people in local markets via in-country and virtual events.

 Analytics
IIP has an advanced analytics capacity to measure output, campaign performance, perform audience analysis and track over 2,000 Department of State social media properties.

See also 
 Public diplomacy
 United States Information Agency

References

External links 
 Official Website
 ShareAmerica

United States
Public relations in the United States
IIP